George Edward Shilling (born 1966 in Redbridge, London) is an English musician, record producer, composer and audio engineer. He is the son of Eric Shilling, formerly of the English National Opera and actress Erica Johns. He studied cello at the Royal College of Music and is best known as an audio engineer, a skill he was taught by Jerry Boys of Abbey Road and Livingston Recording Studios in London.

Career
Shilling has worked with a diverse range of musical genres including artists such as Gabrielle, New Radicals, The Corrs, Blur, Texas, Teenage Fanclub, Primal Scream, Nicole Appleton, Johnny Hallyday Oasis, Mike Oldfield, Eternal, Boy George, James Brown, Mark Almond, Bernard Butler, The Fall, Steve Winwood and the popular light opera duo Operababes.

His first notable success was engineering the hit single The Only Way Is Up (1988) by Yazz and the Plastic Population and released by Big Life. His credits as Record producer include the Soup Dragons's album Lovegod which included their cover of the Rolling Stones hit I'm Free and the most accomplished of the three albums My Life Story, The Golden Mile. He wrote a significant number of songs and also recorded tracks for the English down-tempo band Sundae Club. He co-wrote "London Fantasy" for the French singer Nolwenn Leroy on her album Histoires Naturelles (2005), which was produced by Laurent Voulzy. In 2009 and 2010 he hosted sessions with Ocean Colour Scene at his studio in the Cotswolds. and played cello on their album Saturday. In 2010 he also recorded and mixed Classical Relief For Haiti's single The Prayer, featuring a host of classical crossover artistes including Darius Campbell, Rhydian, Paul Potts and Julian Lloyd Webber.

Audio engineering and mixing credits

1986 	Measure for Measure [Bonus Tracks] Icehouse (Assistant Engineer)
1986 	Measure for Measure Icehouse (Assistant Engineer)
1986 	Talking with the Taxman About Poetry Billy Bragg (Engineer)
1989 	What's That Noise? Coldcut (Engineer)
1990 	Blissed Out The Beloved (Engineering, Mixing)
1991 	Mothers Heaven Texas (Engineer, Mixing)
1996 	Statuesque [CD #1] Sleeper (Mixing)
1996 	Women of Ireland Mike Oldfield (Remix)
1997 	Kowalski [Creation Records] Primal Scream (Engineer Mixing)
1997 	Kowalski [Sire Records] Primal Scream (B Mixing)
1997    Lovebugs Lovebugs Engineer, (Mixing)
1997    Songs from Northern Britain Teenage Fanclub (Engineer, Mixing)
1997 	Star Primal Scream (Mixing, Engineer) 
1997 	Vanishing Point Primal Scream (Mixing)
1998    The Only Way Is Up [Single] Yazz and the Plastic Population (Remix)
1998    Wanted [Album] Yazz (Mixing)
1998    Explore Various Artists (Engineer, Mixing)
1998 	People Move On Bernard Butler (Engineer, Mixing)
1998 	Stay [Promotional] Bernard Butler (Engineer and Mixing)
2000 	Friends and Lovers Bernard Butler (Engineer)
2000    I'd Do It Again If I Could Bernard Butler (Engineer)
2001 	Deeper:The D:Finitive Worship Experience Delirious (Engineer)
2001 	Smiling & Waving Anja Garbarek (B Engineer)
2002 	Cabas Cabas (Mixing)
2002 	Mona Lisa Overdrive [Poptones] Trashmonk (Mixing)
2003 	About Time Steve Winwood (Engineer)
2003 	Contacto Cabas (Engineer)
2003 	Measure for Measure/Primitive Man Icehouse (Engineering assistant)
2003 	Reflections [Special Asian Edition] Paul Van Dyk (Engineer)
2003 	Reflections Paul Van Dyk (Engineer)
2003 	Time of Our Lives: Connected, Vol. 1 Paul Van Dyk (Engineer)
2004    Exitos Mikel Erentxun (Mixing)
2004 	Reflections [EMI Special Edition] Paul Van Dyk (Engineer)
2004 	Reflections [Mute Records Special Edition] Paul Van Dyk (Engineer)
2005    22-20s 22-20s (Engineer)
2005 	About Time [DualDisc] [Bonus Tracks] Steve Winwood (Engineer)
2005 	Band That Prays Together Stays Together [DVD] Killing Joke (Engineer)
2005 	Chronicles Steve Earle (Engineer)
2005 	Deadwing Porcupine Tree Guitar (Engineer)
2005 	Ocean: Songs for the Night Sea Journey Jennifer Cutting (Engineer)
2005 	There's a Fire  Longwave (Engineer)
2006 	Played in Full: 90's – Definitive 12 Collection Various Artists Producer
2006 	Renaissance Opera Babes (Engineer)
2006 	Volume I Billy Bragg (Tape operator)
2007 	Spirit of the Glen  The Royal Scots Dragoon Guards (Mixing)
2008 	Copperhead Road [Deluxe Edition] Steve Earle (Engineer)
2008 	Greatest hits of the 80's Various Artists (Engineer)
2008 	Simple Andy Yorke (Engineer, Mixing)
2008 	Great Unwanted [Bonus Tracks] Lucky Soul (Engineer,Mixing)
2008  	Beyond Imagination Opera Babes 	(Engineer, Mixing)
2008    Greatest hits of the 80's 	Various Artists	(Engineer)
2008 	Simple Andy Yorke (Mixing)
2011    Amber Smith Amber Smith (Mixing)
2019    Show 2000 – Live At Nottingham Rock City 15/12/16 Frank Turner (Mixing and Mastering)Love Is All We Need Mary J. Blige (Remix)The Magic Number De La Soul (Single Mixes)I'm No Angel Heather Nova (Single Mixes)MotherNew Radicals (Remix)The Diver and the Gown Anja Garbarek (Engineering)Lifting Me up [Pepsi Ad/Single] The Corrs (Engineering and Mixing)You Send Me Flying Billie Myers (Engineering and Mixing)Entertain Me Blur [Single Remix]  Telephone Thing The Fall [Single] (Engineer and Mixing)Power of a Woman  Eternal (R&B Remix)Same Thing in Reverse Boy George (12" Mix)Brilliant Creatures Marc Almond [Single and Album] (Mixing)Chemical Thing Stereo MCs/Blue Pearl (Remix)The Payback Mix James Brown (Single UK #12) (Remix)Bed Five Thirty (Recording and mixing)Airhead Boing (Recording and mixing)Modern Pop Music Shine (Engineer and mixing)
How To Do That Jean-Paul Gaultier (Remix)
Let The Spirit Move Ya 60ft Dolls (Remix)

Record production credits

1990 I'm Free The Soup Dragons
1990 Indie Top 20, Vol. 9 Various Artists
1990 Lovegod The Soup Dragons
1990 Mother Universe The Soup Dragons (Remixing)
1996 You're Telling Me Bobby Valentino 
1997 Golden Mile My Life Story
1997 Shorty, Pt. 1 The Wannadies
1997 Shorty, Pt. 2 The Wannadies
1998 You And Me Song (Lounge Version) The Wannadies [Single]
1999 Other Sister Original Soundtrack 
2000 Yeah [CD Single] Wannadies
2004 Transmusicales 25th Various Artists
2004 Technostalgia Sundae Club
2007 Megaphone Theology: B Sides and Rarities My Life Story
2007 Coldcut The Playlist Various Artists
2007 Brit Box: U.K. Indie, Shoegaze, and Brit-Pop Gems of Various Artists (Mixing)
2008 British Summer Time Sundae Club
2008 Great Unwanted [Bonus Tracks] Lucky Soul
2008 Pleasure [Single] The Soup Dragons
I'm Free Soup Dragons [Single UK #5]
Get The Girl And Kill The Baddies Pop Will Eat Itself [Single UK #9]
Bed Five Thirty
Airhead Boing
2010 Hello Heavy EZ Basic

Percussion, Cello and Keyboard credits
1998 People Move On Bernard Butler (Cello) 
2003 Contacto Cabas (Mezcla)
2006 Volume I Billy Bragg (Percussion)
2008 Simple Andy Yorke (Cello, accordion)
2008 Great Unwanted [Bonus Tracks] Lucky Soul (Percussion and keyboards)
2010 Saturday Ocean Colour Scene (Cello)

Other credits
2002 Wishbones David Knopfler (Sound Consultant)

Notes

External sources
George Shilling George's own website
George Shilling video interview at Record production.com
[ George Shilling] at Allmusic
George Shilling sound engineer and producer
Official Sundae Club website

English record producers
English audio engineers
Living people
1966 births